Pranali Ghogare is an Indian actress who primarily works in Hindi films and Hindi television. She made her acting debut in 2014 with Mere Rang Mein Rangne Waali portraying Radha Pathak Chaturvedi. She made her Hindi film debut with Nikhil Advani's Short film Guddu Engineer in 2016.

In 2018, Ghogare made her Marathi film debut with Ranangan and Telugu film debut with Manchukurisevelalo.

Career
Ghogare made her acting debut with Mere Rang Mein Rangne Waali portraying Radha Pathak Chaturvedi opposite Samridh Bawa from 2014 to 2015.

She made her film debut in 2016 with the Hindi short film Guddu Engineer, portraying Sonia opposite Prabuddh Dyma. It proved as a major turning point in her career.

In 2018, Ghogare made her Marathi film debut with Ranangan portraying Sanika Deshmukh opposite Siddharth Chandekar. It received mixed to positive reviews from critics. The same year, she portrayed Durdhara opposite Kartikey Malviya in Chandragupta Maurya.

She made her Telugu film debut in 2018, with Manchukurisevelalo portraying Geetha opposite Ram Karthik. The film received mostly mixed reviews.

Ghogare portrayed Poorva Mishra Tripathi in Rajaa Betaa opposite Dishank Arora in 2019. The same year, she portrayed Risha in the Hindi film Fastey Fasaatey opposite Nachiket Narvekar. It received mostly negative reviews.

In 2022, she portrayed Meena in Human, marking her web debut. It received positive reviews from critics.

Filmography

Films

Television

Web series

See also
List of Indian television actresses

References

External links

Indian film actresses
Year of birth missing (living people)
Living people
Indian television actresses
Actresses in Hindi cinema
21st-century Indian actresses